Scorched: South Africa's Changing Climate is a non-fiction book by Leonie Joubert.

Synopsis
Scorched is a narrative on southern Africa’s landscapes in the age of climate change. It reads from a local point of view. The book deals with climate modeling produced by scientific institutions. Scorched ponders the morality of the changes mankind has wrought, as well as the future of life on Earth.

Awards
In May 2007, Scorched was awarded an honorable mention by the judging panel of the Sunday Times Alan Paton Literary Awards.
"The judges have chosen to cite Scorched for an Honorary Award for breaking into the new territory of science journalism, and its skill in popularising this often inaccessible field."

Paperback - 240 pages (30 September 2006) South Africa: Wits University Press

External links
 Website of book
 Sunday Times Literary Awards 
 Interview with the author

Environmental non-fiction books
2007 non-fiction books
South African non-fiction books
Books about South Africa
Climate change books